Françoise de Langlade (1921 – June 17, 1983) was a magazine editor with Conde Nast Publications and the wife of fashion designer Oscar de la Renta. She was named to the International Best Dressed List Hall of Fame in 1973.

Biography
De Langlade was born in Paris, the daughter of an insurance salesman from Bordeaux, France, and a mother from Martinique. She was educated in Paris. She started her career in fashion with The House of Schiaparelli, which she left to work at Harper's Bazaar. She joined French Vogue in 1951, where she served as Fashion Editor and Editor-in-Chief. In 1967, she married Oscar de la Renta and moved to the United States. In 1968, she joined American Vogue where she served as Editor-at-Large. She also worked as a Fashion and Beauty Editor for Elizabeth Arden International. She is credited with using her established network of contacts to help promote her husband's brand.

Personal life
De Langlade married three times. Her first husband was French businessman Jean Bruere with whom she had one son, Jean Marc Bruere; the marriage ended in divorce. Her second husband was diplomat, Nicholas Bagenow, son of Leïla_Hagondokoff; they also divorced. In 1967, she married Oscar de la Renta. The de la Rentas had homes in Manhattan, Kent, Connecticut, and Santo Domingo. She died of bone cancer in 1983.

References

1921 births
1983 deaths
French people of Martiniquais descent
Fashion editors
Vogue (magazine) people
French emigrants to the United States
Journalists from Paris
Deaths from bone cancer
Deaths from cancer in New York (state)